Heringita is a moth genus in the family Autostichidae.

Species
 Heringita heringi Agenjo, 1953
 Heringita amseli (Gozmány, 1954)
 Heringita dentulata (Gozmány, 1967)
 Heringita perarmata (Gozmány, 2000)

References

Holcopogoninae